Collanmore Island (from Irish: Collainn Mhór) is an island in Clew Bay, County Mayo, Ireland.

Features
One of the bigger islands in the bay, Collanmore was a base of Les Glénans, a non-profit sailing school. The base taught dinghy and catamaran sailing and sail-boarding. From Collanmore there are views of Croagh Patrick and the bay. It is accessed by boat from Rosmoney pier, a few kilometres from Westport, County Mayo. In 2011 there were 4 registered inhabitants of Collanmore Island.

Demographics 
The table below reports data on Collanmore's population taken from Discover the Islands of Ireland (Alex Ritsema, Collins Press, 1999) and the Census of Ireland.

References 

Islands of County Mayo